Ružica ("little Ruža") may refer to:

Ružica (given name)
Ružica Church in the Belgrade Fortress
Ružica, the old name for Gnjilane

See also
 
Ruža (disambiguation)